Sir Samuel Halliday McCartney (1833–1906), also spelled Halliday Macartney, was a Scottish military surgeon and diplomat serving the Chinese government during the late Qing dynasty.

McCartney was a member of the same family as George Macartney, the 18th century British ambassador to China.

He studied medicine at the University of Edinburgh Medical School, graduating MD in 1858 with a thesis on phthisis. He served as a surgeon in the Crimean War, then went with his regiment to China and resigned his commission to join the Chinese army of General Charles Gordon which was subduing the Taiping rebels. He decided to make his home in China and married the niece of Chinese politician Li Hongzhang in December 1864. He became a civil servant of the Chinese imperial government, first in China and then in England. His first wife was a near relative of Lar Wang (納王郜雲官), one of the leaders of the Taiping rebellion. They had three sons and a daughter; the eldest son, George, served as the British representative in Kashgar for 28 years. The family lived in Nanjing until 1876 when Macartney left for London to serve as secretary to successive Chinese ministers at the Court of St James. His wife stayed behind and died two years later.

McCartney served as Counsellor to the Chinese Legation in London for the remaining 30 years of his life. Notably, he oversaw the capture and detainment of Chinese nationalist leader Sun Yat-Sen at the Chinese Legation in 1896. Macartney intended to deport Sun Yat-Sen back to the Qing Empire for execution, but the intervention of Sun's ally and former teacher Sir James Cantlie turned the imprisonment into a press sensation, and brought public support to Sun. Macartney released Sun Yat-Sen after 12 days of detainment, under pressure from the foreign office. The incident greatly raised Sun Yat-Sen's public profile as a reformer and revolutionary, and gave his movement more clout; Sun would go on to lead the revolution that overthrew the Qing and found the Republic of China.

McCartney re-married in 1884 Jeanne Léon du Satoy, daughter of Jacques Léon du Sautoy, of Fontainebleau. Lady Macartney died at Hove, near Brighton, on 9 September 1902, and was interred at Dundrennan Abbey, Kirkcudbrightshire, Scotland seven days later. Sir Halliday died in 1906 at his home, Kenbank, St John's Town of Dalry and was also buried at Dundrennan Abbey.

McCartney received the first grade of the second class of the Imperial Chinese Order of the Double Dragon in May 1902.

References

1833 births
1906 deaths
19th-century Scottish medical doctors
Alumni of the University of Edinburgh
People from Castle Douglas
Qing dynasty diplomats